Sir Edwin Lutyens (1869–1944) was a British architect.

Lutyens may also refer to:

Charles Augustus Henry Lutyens (1829–1915), British soldier and painter, father of Sir Edwin Lutyens
Elisabeth Lutyens (1906–1983), British composer, daughter of Sir Edwin Lutyens
Mary Wemyss (1868–1951), born Mary Lutyens, English novelist, sister of Sir Edwin Lutyens
Mary Lutyens (1908–1999), British writer and biographer of Jiddu Krishnamurti, daughter of Sir Edwin Lutyens
Sally Lutyens (1927–2005), American composer and author
Campbell Lutyens, a private equity advisory firm

See also
Lutjens (disambiguation)
Luyten (disambiguation)